Walter Ardone (born 30 January 1972) is an Australian former professional soccer player who played as a midfielder.

Club career
Ardone played his early football for Sydney Olympic, making his National Soccer League debut in 1992. He moved in 1993 to Parramatta Eagles where spent a season before moving again to Heidelberg United. After a year at Heidelberg he returned to Olympic. In 1998, he moved to Sydney United for a season before a move to Parramatta Power. In two season with the Power he played 37 NSL matches. In 2002, he played thirteen times for Singapore team Geylang United.

International career
Ardone played one match for the Australia national football team in 1996 in a match against Chile in Antofagasta.

References

1972 births
Living people
Footballers from Buenos Aires
Australian soccer players
Association football midfielders
Sydney Olympic FC players
Parramatta FC players
Heidelberg United FC players
Sydney United 58 FC players
Parramatta Power players
Geylang International FC players
National Soccer League (Australia) players
Singapore Premier League players
Australia international soccer players
Australian expatriate soccer players
Australian expatriate sportspeople in Singapore
Expatriate footballers in Singapore